The Cauto River or Río Cauto is the longest river in Cuba, as well as the longest river in the Caribbean. Located in the southeast of the island, it is one of two navigable rivers in Cuba, the other being the Sagua la Grande River.

Overview
However, it provides only  of navigable waterway. A 2013 study led by multiple Cuban academic institutions determined that the river could be 'classified as unpolluted to moderately polluted'.

It flows through the provinces of Santiago de Cuba, Holguin, and Granma. The communities of Palma Soriano, Cauto Cristo, and Rio Cauto are located along the river. Rice, sugarcane, tobacco, and cattle are the primary agricultural beneficiaries along its course.

Gallery

References

External links

Rivers of Cuba
Geography of Granma Province
Geography of Santiago de Cuba Province